The Diocese of Saint Petersburg is a Latin Church ecclesiastical territory or diocese of the Catholic Church in Florida. It comprises , encompassing Pinellas, Hillsborough, Pasco, Hernando, and Citrus counties on the west central coast of the State of Florida, along the shore of the Gulf of Mexico. The total population is 3,116,283, with a Catholic population of 461,209. The principal cities are Tampa, St. Petersburg, and Clearwater. The Diocese of Saint Petersburg is a suffragan diocese in the ecclesiastical province of the metropolitan Archdiocese of Miami.

History
The Catholic Church's presence in this part of Florida stretches back nearly five hundred years to the arrival of the Spanish explorers and the missionaries who accompanied them. After Juan Ponce de León's initial discovery of Florida and Tampa Bay in 1513, explorers over the next several decades such as Panfilo de Narvaez in 1528 and Hernando de Soto in 1539 came here, bringing with them priests and religious in the hope of native conversions. Juan Xuárez (sometimes written "Suárez") lead a group of thirteen Franciscan and diocesan priests in the Narváez expedition which came ashore in April 1528.

The hostility of the native peoples in this area, however, continued to frustrate Spanish missionary and expansionist plans as demonstrated by the martyrdom of Luis de Cancer on the shores of Tampa Bay in 1549. Spain finally gained a firm foothold on the Florida peninsula with the establishment of the St. Augustine colony in 1565. This prompted another missionary effort to this area that was begun by the Jesuits in 1567, though it was abandoned five years later because of the poor living conditions and the continued hostility of the native tribes. Spanish missionaries then turned their attention to the friendlier tribes of north Florida.

Arrival of Catholics
The Tampa Bay Area remained largely unpopulated until Florida became a territory of the United States in 1821. Shortly thereafter, the Ft. Brooke military garrison was established in what is today downtown Tampa. The founding of St. Louis Catholic Church in Tampa in 1860 provided a focal point for Catholics.

After a serious outbreak of yellow fever in Tampa in 1888 that killed three of the four priests there, Bishop Moore of the Diocese of St. Augustine turned to the Jesuits from New Orleans for help. Not only did the Jesuit Fathers take over St. Louis Church, but they were responsible for founding many of the early parishes and schools of the area. In 1905, a new church was constructed in Romanesque style and the parish was renamed Sacred Heart. It is the oldest parish and church within the diocese.

After the establishment of the Catholic colony of San Antonio and the Parish of St. Anthony of Padua in the early 1880s, the Benedictine monks and nuns, who came to Pasco County later in the decade, became another important religious community in the history of the diocese. Based at Saint Leo Abbey and Holy Name Priory respectively, they founded, and staffed for many years, most of the parishes of Pasco, Hernando and Citrus Counties. Other early pioneer Religious include the Sisters of the Holy Names of Jesus and Mary, who founded the oldest Catholic school in 1881, the Sisters of St. Joseph, who came to educate Black children, and the Redemptorists and Salesians, both of whom worked in the immigrant Latin community.

The growing population and economic boom following World War II brought major changes to the area, much of it under the tutelage of the sixth bishop of St. Augustine, Joseph P. Hurley. Archbishop Hurley presided over the largest institutional build-up in the history of the Florida church. Not only did the archbishop purchase property for future investment or development, he also established many new parishes and schools and recruited many priests from Ireland and the north United States to staff them. More than 40% of the parishes within the diocese today were founded during the Hurley years.

Erection of the Diocese
Because of the growth of the church in Florida, plans for a new diocese along the West Coast were developed as early as the mid-fifties. Contrary to Archbishop Hurley's recommendations, Miami was chosen instead of the Tampa Bay area and the new diocese was created in south Florida in 1958. Barely five years later, plans were drawn up for two new dioceses in central Florida.

On June 17, 1968, Pope Paul VI erected the Catholic Diocese of St. Petersburg with territory taken from the Diocese of St. Augustine and the Metropolitan Archdiocese of Miami, making it a suffragan see for the same metropolitan archdiocese.  He appointed Charles B. McLaughlin as the first Bishop of St. Petersburg and designated the Cathedral of St. Jude the Apostle in St. Petersburg as its seat. The newly created diocese stretched from Crystal River to Ft. Myers encompassing eleven counties. The first task of the Bronx native and former auxiliary bishop of Raleigh, North Carolina, was to establish a new diocesan structure to unify priests, personnel, policy, and people from the two dioceses. He also faced the challenge of dealing with the rapidly increasing population within his diocese.

McLaughlin inherited many priests from the Diocese of St. Augustine and Miami and relied on their cooperation and assistance. He also fostered native vocations and was a strong supporter of the Floridian seminaries. McLaughlin had the responsibility of meeting the pastoral demands of over two hundred miles from end to end. McLaughlin, who was a pilot, often flew from event to event to try to keep pace with this task, a characteristic that earned him the nickname "Hurricane Charlie."

He died on December 14, 1978.

Bishop Larkin

W. Thomas Larkin, the vicar general of the diocese and interim diocesan administrator, was appointed the second Bishop of St. Petersburg on April 17, 1979. He was ordained to the episcopate on May 27 by his former classmate, Pope John Paul II. Larkin was formally installed as the diocese's second bishop on June 28. Larkin's ambitious pastoral plan resulted in the establishment of fifteen new parishes and three new schools. On Friday, May 13, 1983 Larkin dedicated the Diocese of St. Petersburg to the Immaculate Heart of Mary.

In the summer of 1984, the Diocese of Venice in Florida, one of two new Florida dioceses, was created in part from the southern portion of the Diocese of St. Petersburg. After the establishment of the Diocese of Venice on October 25, the Diocese of St. Petersburg comprised Citrus, Hernando, Hillsborough, Pasco and Pinellas Counties.

Larkin expanded the outreach of the social ministries of the diocese, established a radio station (WBVM 90.5 FM), and further sought to keep pace with the population growth and economic expansion of the 1980s. His pastoral plan to develop new parishes had to be curtailed due to mounting debt and a general economic downturn.

Larkin announced his retirement for health reasons in November 1988. He died in November 2007.

Bishop Favalora
John Clement Favalora, a native of New Orleans and former Bishop of Alexandria, Louisiana, was installed as the third Bishop of St. Petersburg on May 16, 1989. He directed his time toward administrative reorganization to manage demands brought on by the rapid growth of the 1980s. Initially, Favalora consolidated the various administrative functions of the diocese through the reorganization of the Chancery and the consolidation of diocesan social outreach programs through Catholic Charities. He also established a second radio station (WLMS 88.3 FM) to reach the northern portions of the diocese.

Favalora made Catholic education a priority within the diocese. He gave his leadership to the Catholic Education Foundation to ensure the continued existence of the Catholic schools within the diocese. He also took an active role in planning for the future construction of new Catholic schools.

Declaring "A Year of Favor From The Lord", Favalora presided over a fourteen-month celebration marking the twenty-fifth anniversary of the establishment of the Diocese of St. Petersburg. Favalora closed the Jubilee Year with a solemn pontifical liturgy at the Cathedral of St. Jude the Apostle on April 17, 1994. In November, Favalora was named the third Archbishop of Miami and was installed on December 20.

Bishop Lynch
After nearly a year of vacancy in which Brendan Muldoon administered the diocese, Pope John Paul II appointed Robert N. Lynch the fourth Bishop of St. Petersburg on December 5, 1995. A priest of the Archdiocese of Miami, former rector of the St. John Vianney College Seminary in Miami, and former General Secretary to the National Conference of Catholic Bishops, Lynch was already well known in the diocese. He was consecrated bishop in his own Cathedral, only the fourth time in Florida history and the first time in seventy-four years, on January 26, 1996, by Archbishop John C. Favalora. Lynch's consecration brought the largest number of bishops to the diocese at one time. Cardinal Joseph Bernardin delivered the homily.

Lynch continued the reorganization and management of the diocese begun under Favalora. He commissioned the building of a new Pastoral Center, and on March 31, 2000, the newly erected Bishop W. Thomas Larkin Pastoral Center was formally dedicated. The purpose of this new edifice was rededication to service in one space, one place, and it brought together under one roof ministries from several locations throughout the diocese. Like Favalora, Lynch made Catholic education, in the Catholic schools as well as in the religious education programs of the parishes, a top priority in the diocese. He also took an active role in planning for the future construction of new Catholic high schools, and improvements to the existing schools.

From the beginning of his episcopacy, Lynch made himself present to the priests, deacons, religious, and faithful of the Diocese of St. Petersburg. He recognized the talents and abilities of priests, religious, and laity alike. That recognition crossed the boundaries of gender, age, and ethnicity. It was apparent in the appointments he made to positions within the diocesan structure.

In the summer of 1998, as preparation for the Jubilee Year 2000, Lynch began the program Renew 2000 in the diocese. At the heart of this program is the development of small, Christian faith-sharing communities. This program, as well as other programs of spiritual renewal already present in the diocese, was intended to create an active and informed Catholic laity in the diocese. In addition, in the Fall of 1998, Lynch lent his earnest support to the Lay Pastoral Ministry Institute, a program of training for the laity which included studies and formation in the areas of theology, spirituality, and pastoral ministry.

In further preparation for the great Jubilee Year, Lynch focused on the Jubilee concepts of forgiveness, freedom, and release from burden. To do this, he presided at communal celebrations for the sacrament of penance throughout the diocese. He also instituted a "debt-forgiveness" program by which he released parishes in need from the burden of millions of dollars of construction debt, its payment and its longevity.

Through his first Capital Campaign of the diocese, Lynch increased the priests' retirement fund; started plans for the building of a Family Life/Spirituality Center for the spiritual growth of the people; established an endowment fund for Catholic Charities with special emphasis on support for senior citizens; and established two endowment funds for youth ministry: one for the youth ministers themselves, and the other for leadership development and scholarships for the youth under their care.

On April 3, 2001, at the diocesan Chrism Mass, Lynch announced the first diocesan synod to convene on the Second Sunday of Easter, 2002, and to end with a first-ever diocesan Eucharistic Congress in the Fall of 2003. At this same Mass, Lynch also announced the establishment of a diocesan pastoral council to ensure further collaboration among the people of the diocese.

Lynch's retirement was accepted by Pope Francis on November 28, 2016, and Gregory Lawrence Parkes of Pensacola-Tallahassee was named as his replacement. On May 6, 2018, Parkes consecrated the diocese to the Immaculate Heart of Mary.

Bishops
The list of bishops of the diocese and their years of service:
 Charles Borromeo McLaughlin (1968-1978)
 William Thomas Larkin (1979-1988)
 John Clement Favalora (1989-1994), appointed Archbishop of Miami
 Robert Nugent Lynch (1995-2016)
 Gregory Lawrence Parkes (2017–present)

Auxiliary bishop:
Joseph Keith Symons (1981-1983), appointed Bishop of Pensacola-Tallahassee

Other priest of this diocese who became a bishop:
David Leon Toups, appointed Bishop of Beaumont in 2020

Coat of arms

High schools
 Academy of the Holy Names, Tampa
 Bishop McLaughlin Catholic High School, Spring Hill
 Clearwater Central Catholic High School, Clearwater
 Jesuit High School, Tampa
 St. Petersburg Catholic High School, St. Petersburg
 Tampa Catholic High School, Tampa

See also

 Catholic Church by country
 Catholic Church hierarchy
 List of the Catholic dioceses of the United States

References

External links 
Diocese of Saint Petersburg Official Site

 
Christian organizations established in 1968
Saint Petersburg
Saint Petersburg
1968 establishments in Florida